Paper Crown King is the fourth and final album by British band Seafood, released on 4 September 2006 in the United Kingdom and 13 February 2007 in North America.

Track listing
All songs written by Seafood.

"I Will Talk" – 4:31
"Signal Sparks" – 4:52
"Between the Noise Pt.2" – 4:22
"Time & Tides" – 4:53
"Last Outpost" – 5:49
"Awkward Ghost" – 4:28
"Disappear" – 5:05
"Little Pieces" – 3:03
"Paper Crown King" – 5:17
"How You Gonna Live Without Me?" – 3:23

Personnel
David Line - Vocals, guitars
Kevin Penney - Guitars
Kevin Hendrick - Bass, vocals
Caroline Banks - Drums
Peter Back - Saxophone on "How You Gonna Live Without Me?"

References

2006 albums
Seafood (band) albums
Cooking Vinyl albums